William Ernest Mason (July 7, 1850June 16, 1921) was a Republican U.S. Representative and Senator from Illinois. He was the father of Winnifred Sprague Mason Huck.

Mason was born in Franklinville, New York. His family moved to Bentonsport, Iowa when he was 8. He attended Birmingham College. After graduating, he taught at Bentonsport Academy, which he had previously attended. After studying law, he moved to Chicago in 1872 and was admitted to the bar.

Mason was elected to Congress in 1886 and again two years later. Following his defeat in 1890, he returned to law practice in Chicago in 1891 but was elected to the U.S. Senate in 1896. After one term, he returned to Chicago. He served three more terms in the House from 1917 until his death. Mason often was an opponent of U.S. intervention in foreign affairs. He delivered a fiery speech advocating self-governance for the Philippines during the Philippine–American War at the turn of the 20th century: "You cannot govern the Philippine Islands without taxing them. You have not yet their consent to tax them. You propose again to tax them without representation. Look out for tea parties"   On April 5, 1917, he was one of 50 representatives who voted against declaring war on Germany.

He is buried in Oakwood Cemetery in Waukegan, Illinois.

See also
1914 United States Senate election in Illinois
List of United States Congress members who died in office (1900–49)

References

External links

 

William E. Mason, Memorial addresses delivered in the House of Representatives and Senate frontispiece 1922

Republican Party Illinois state senators
Republican Party members of the Illinois House of Representatives
Illinois lawyers
People from Franklinville, New York
Politicians from Chicago
1850 births
1921 deaths
Republican Party United States senators from Illinois
Republican Party members of the United States House of Representatives from Illinois
19th-century American lawyers